Visitors to Bosnia and Herzegovina must obtain a visa from one of the Bosnia and Herzegovina diplomatic missions unless they come from one of the visa exempt countries.

As an applicant country for membership in the European Union, Bosnia and Herzegovina maintains visa policy similar to the visa policy of the Schengen Area. Bosnia and Herzegovina grants visa-free entry to all Schengen Annex II nationalities and it also grants visa-free entry to several additional countries – Azerbaijan, Bahrain, China, Kosovo, Kuwait, Oman, Qatar, Russia and Turkey.

Visa policy map

Visa-free access
Holders of passports of the following 102 jurisdictions, including resident stateless persons and refugees, may enter and stay in Bosnia and Herzegovina for up to 90 days within 180 days without a visa (unless otherwise noted):

1 - May enter using a national ID card (incl. Irish passport card) for a stay of up to 90 days within 180 days

The maximum stay is granted within 6 months (2 months to citizens of Russia and Ukraine).

Substitute visas
Valid multiple entry visa holders and residents of the European Union, Schengen Area member states, and United States of America can enter Bosnia and Herzegovina without a visa for a maximum stay of 30 days. This is not applicable to holders of Kosovan passport.

Non-ordinary passports
Holders of diplomatic or official/service passports of Belarus, China, Cuba, Egypt, Indonesia, Iran, Jordan, Kazakhstan, Moldova, Pakistan, Saudi Arabia and Tunisia and holders of only diplomatic passports of Algeria and Armenia do not require a visa for Bosnia and Herzegovina. Visa is also not required for stateless persons and refugees residing in countries whose citizens do not require a visa for Bosnia and Herzegovina (except for countries of Central and South America and the Caribbean).

Reciprocity
Bosnia and Herzegovina citizens can enter without a visa some of the countries whose citizens are granted visa-free access to Bosnia and Herzegovina but require a visa for Antigua and Barbuda, Argentina, Australia, Bahrain, Barbados, Brunei, Canada, Colombia, Costa Rica, El Salvador, Grenada (grants visa on arrival), Guatemala, Honduras, Ireland, Israel, Japan, Kiribati, Kuwait, Mauritius (grants visa on arrival), Marshall Islands, Mexico, New Zealand, Nicaragua, Oman, Paraguay, Qatar, Saint Kitts and Nevis, Solomon Islands, Taiwan, Timor-Leste, Tonga, Tuvalu (grants visa on arrival), United Arab Emirates, United Kingdom, United States, Uruguay, Vanuatu and Venezuela.

COVID-19 pandemic
During the COVID-19 pandemic, entry was not allowed for persons who had previously visited China, Iran, Italy or South Korea.

Visitors statistics
Most visitors arriving to Bosnia and Herzegovina on short-term basis are from the following countries of nationality:

See also

Visa requirements for Bosnia and Herzegovina citizens
Visa policy of the Schengen Area

References

External links
Visa Information and Decision on visas 

Foreign relations of Bosnia and Herzegovina
Bosnia and Herzegovina